Carolina is a census-designated place (CDP) in Marion County, West Virginia, United States. Carolina has a post office with ZIP code 26563. As of the 2010 census, its population was 411.

The community was named after Caroline Watson, a daughter of mining executive James Watson.

Notable person
Carolina is the hometown of Alabama Crimson Tide football head coach Nick Saban.

References

Census-designated places in Marion County, West Virginia
Census-designated places in West Virginia